Beckton railway station was a railway station in Beckton, London originally owned by the Gas Light and Coke Company, to serve the (then) recently built Beckton Gas Works. The line was opened for freight in 1872 and to passengers in 1874. It was leased to the Great Eastern Railway from 1874.

History
Beckton was the only station on the Beckton branch of the railway, which left the EC&TJR at Custom House, heading initially east by north-east before levelling out to due east once it crossed what is today the Woolwich Manor Way. The station shut to passengers in 1940 after bombing in the Blitz cut it off from the rest of the network. Passenger services were not resumed when the line reopened as by now the works was better served by bus services using the Barking by-pass. The branch survived as a freight line, with the last trainload of pitch from the works leaving in December 1970.

Replacement
Today, most of the line to Beckton has been taken up and is now a public footpath, known as the "Beckton Corridor". A short stretch of the line east of Woolwich Manor Way has been reused as the final part of the Beckton branch of the Docklands Light Railway. Beckton DLR station is located several hundred yards west of Beckton railway station; "eastbound" trains from Gallions Reach loop back round over the old line in the reverse direction, entering the station from the east.

References

Railway stations in Great Britain opened in 1874
Railway stations in Great Britain closed in 1940
Disused railway stations in the London Borough of Newham
Eastern Counties and Thames Junction Railway
Beckton Railway station